Vidzeme Region, officially Vidzeme Planning Region is one of the five planning regions of Latvia, it is situated in the northern part of Latvia. The state institution was founded on 2 October 2006, based on the creation of the region territory as prescribed by Regulations No. 133 of the Cabinet of Ministers as of 25 March 2003, the "Regulations on Territories of Planning Regions". As of 2020, the region's population was 211,309.

Geography 
The territory of the Vidzeme Region was created in 2006.

Demography 
Vidzeme Region had a population of 211,309 inhabitants in 2020.

See also 
Planning regions of Latvia
Administrative divisions of Latvia

References

External links 
Vidzeme planning region

Subdivisions of Latvia
States and territories established in 2006
2006 establishments in Latvia